Las Malcriadas (English: Bad Maids) is a Mexican telenovela produced and directed by Joshua Mintz for TV Azteca. It is an original story by Ximena Escalante and written by César Sierra and Carlos Madrid and directed by Mintz, Moisés Urquidi and Raúl Caballero. It stars Sara Maldonado as the titular character. Production started on June 28, 2017 and it premiered on September 18, 2017.

Plot 
The series follows the story of Laura (Sara Maldonado), a young journalist who suffers the loss of her mother and cleaning her personal belongings, discovers evidence that leads her to assume that her biological mother was another woman. Full of sadness for the death of her adoptive mother and with anger towards her family for having lied to her, Laura makes the most difficult decision of her life and decides to look for information that leads her to find the whereabouts of the woman who gave her life. In this process she discovers that her journey is more dangerous than she imagined, and will have to face a series of experiences that she never imagined to live—In this way—Laura will meet four other brave women, full of dreams, and with an immense desire to get ahead, who will be their companions of adventures. However, she will also encounter dark characters who will do what is necessary for Laura not to discover everything behind her origin. Later, Laura and these women will be identified by the press and society as Las Malcriadas, as they are accused of some crimes.

Cast

Main 
 Sara Maldonado as Laura Espinosa
 Ernesto Laguardia as Mario Espinosa
 Gonzalo García Vivanco as Diego Mendoza
 Rebecca Jones as Catalina Basurto

Recurring 

 Carlos Torres as Jerónimo Aguirre
 Ivonne Montero as Rosa Ochoa
 Cynthia Rodríguez as Teresa Villa
 Alejandra Ambrosi as Stephanie Basurto
 Juanita Arias as Esmirna Benavente
 Elsa Ortiz as Dunia García
 Javier Díaz Dueñas as Julian
 Rodrigo Cachero as Joaquín Figueroa
 Martín Barba as Eduardo Espinosa 
 Blanca Calderón as TBA
 Mar Carrera as Lidia 
 Laura Palma as Gabriela Rodríguez de Figueroa / Úrsula
 Ernesto Álvarez as Silvio Luna
 Sebastián Caicedo as Jaime Rosales
 Vince Miranda as Acevedo
 Heriberto Méndez as ablo Jiménez
 Alexis Meana as Andrés Jiménez
 Anna Carreiro as Sabrina Altieri
 Verónica Terán as Martha
 Jorge Fink as Fermín Rojas
 Anna Silvia Garza as Cruz Palacios
 Fátima Molina as Yuridia Cavarca
 Andrea Torre as Brenda
 Gina Moret as Irma
 Bárbara Falconi as Avelina
 Daniela Berriel as TBA
 Carlos Girón as Mateo Altieri
 Dasha Santoyo as TBA
 Andrea Carreiro as TBA
 Camila Rojas as Concha
 Margarita Vega as TBA
 Héctor Parra as TBA
 Carlos Álvarez as TBA
 David Alejandro as TBA
 Mabel Cadena as Juanita Ortiz Joven
 Ulises Ávila as TBA
 Dolores Heredia as Juana
 Héctor Parra

Ratings

References 

2017 telenovelas
2017 Mexican television series debuts
Mexican telenovelas
TV Azteca telenovelas
2018 Mexican television series endings
Spanish-language telenovelas